The 1978 Oklahoma gubernatorial election was held on November 7, 1978, for Governor of Oklahoma. Incumbent Democratic Governor David Boren chose not to run for re-election to a second term in office. Instead Boren decided to run for the United States Senate. Former governor, and sitting lieutenant governor George Nigh was elected, defeating Republican nominee Ron Shotts.

Democratic primary
The primary elections took place on August 22, 1978.

Candidates
 Larry Derryberry, state attorney general
 Bob Funston
 George Nigh, lieutenant governor, and former governor of Oklahoma

Results

Runoff
The Runoff election took place on September 19, 1978.

Republican primary
The primary elections took place on August 22, 1978.

Candidates
Jim Head
Jerry L. Mash
Ron Shotts, former Oklahoma Sooners football player

Results

Independents

Candidates
 Billy Joe Clegg
 Jim McCuiston
 Floyd Shealy

General election

Results

See also
 1978 United States elections
 1978 United States gubernatorial elections
 1978 United States Senate elections

References

Gubernatorial
1978
Oklahoma
November 1978 events in the United States